W. W. "Fred" Waite was an American football coach.  He served as the head football coach at Washington Agricultural College and School of Science—now known as Washington State University—for one season in 1895, compiling a record of 2–0.

Head coaching record

References

Year of birth missing
Year of death missing
Washington State Cougars football coaches